Brian Lee Rolston (born February 21, 1973) is an American former professional ice hockey player who most recently played for the Boston Bruins of the National Hockey League (NHL). He won a Stanley Cup with the New Jersey Devils in 1995, and the World Cup of Hockey in 1996 playing for the United States. Rolston has represented the U.S. three times in Olympic competition for ice hockey. In the 2002 Salt Lake City Olympics, he won the silver medal. Rolston was born in Flint, Michigan, but grew up in Ann Arbor, Michigan. He has served as head coach of the Little Caesars 2001 hockey club as well as assisting with the Little Caesars 2005 team.

Playing career 
As a youth, Rolston played in the 1985 and 1987 Quebec International Pee-Wee Hockey Tournaments with the Detroit Compuware and Detroit Red Wings minor ice hockey teams.

Rolston is considered a utility forward, as he can play as a center, left wing and right wing competently. Standing 6'2' and 214 pounds in his playing days, he was best known for his highly regarded two-way ability.

Rolston was drafted in the 1991 NHL Entry Draft by the New Jersey Devils as their second pick in the first round. Prior to his NHL career, Rolston played for Lake Superior State University (where as a freshman he scored the game-winning goal and earned Most Outstanding Player honors in the National Championship game, which his team won), then the Albany River Rats of the American Hockey League (AHL). He has played for the Devils, the Minnesota Wild, the Colorado Avalanche and the Boston Bruins. Rolston was one of four players who was traded from Colorado in the 2000 deal that sent the Bruins' Ray Bourque to the Avalanche. He scored a then career-high 62 points, including nine shorthanded goals in 2001–02 with the Bruins to establish a club record. During his career, he scored a total of 33 shorthanded goals.

Rolston signed with the Minnesota Wild as an unrestricted free agent on July 8, 2004, though his Wild debut did not occur until the 2005–06 season due to the 2004–05 NHL lockout. Rolston often quarterbacked the Wild's powerplay (a task normally given to a defenseman) due to his booming shot from the point and strong two-way ability. During the season, he was an on-ice leader and was one of the Wild's top scorers, scoring a new career high of 79 points. He was named as team captain for Minnesota for February, October and November 2006 and January 2007. During 2006–07, Rolston scored three goals (one on a penalty shot and two in overtime shootouts), using a slapshot from the slot. He was selected for the 2006–07 NHL Western Conference All-Star Team. During the game, Rolston scored two goals and added two assists. Rolston's shot is also known for making Anaheim Ducks goaltender Jean-Sébastien Giguère duck for cover during a game in the 2007–08 season when Rolston fired a slapshot from the right wing aiming for the top left corner of the net. Giguère ducked to avoid being hit in the mask, resulting in a goal for Rolston.  In a similar event during the 2006–07 NHL season, Rolston fired a slapshot on Vancouver Canucks goaltender Roberto Luongo. The shot hit Luongo in the mask, and though unhurt, Luongo was dazed for minutes, lying on the ice until the team's trainer confirmed he was okay to continue the game. Rolston would later score on a penalty shot using his slapshot in the same game against Luongo.

On June 29, 2008, Rolston's negotiating rights were traded to the Tampa Bay Lightning in return for a conditional draft pick in 2009 or 2010. After failing to agree to a contract with the Lightning, Rolston became a free agent the next day on July 1, 2008, and signed a four-year, $20 million contract to return to the New Jersey Devils.

Rolston was traded to the New York Islanders for Trent Hunter. In reaction to the trade, Rolston was quoted by The Star Ledger as saying, "It's been a bit of a rough ride in Jersey, I'm actually happy to go to a place that wants me. I just want to start new. I'm actually really happy about the change... I saw it coming. There was no blindside here. It was something we discussed from the end of the season and into the summer." Rolston had been waived by the Devils during the 2010–11 season, and was then entering the final year of the four-year contract he signed in 2008.

After a poor performance on the Islanders where he only scored nine points, Rolston was traded to the Boston Bruins (along with Mike Mottau) in exchange for Yannick Riendeau and Marc Cantin.

After 17 seasons and 1,256 career NHL games, Rolston announced his retirement from the NHL on April 30, 2013.

Slapshot notoriety 
Rolston's frequent use of the slapshot became a specific subject of notoriety during his tenure with the Minnesota Wild. While Rolston was known for having an above average slapshot early in his career, his use of it on penalty shots and shootouts garnered NHL-wide attention and resulted in Sports Illustrated ranking his shot eighth all-time in March 2013, after Rolston's retirement. The advent of his unorthodox approach began after Jacques Lemaire, head coach of the Wild, mentioned to Rolston during a practice he had a dream the night before that Rolston used a slapshot in a shootout and scored. The very next day, in a game against the Vancouver Canucks, Rolston scored on a penalty shot, beating goaltender Roberto Luongo with a slapshot. After this, Rolston began to use the slapshot regularly in these situations.

Personal life
Rolston and his wife Jennifer have four sons: Ryder, Brody, Stone and Zane. His older brother is Ron Rolston, a former coach of the Buffalo Sabres. Rolston has been a resident of Traverse City, Michigan.

Career statistics

Regular season and playoffs

International

Awards and honors

See also
List of NHL players with 1000 games played

References

External links
 

1973 births
Living people
Albany River Rats players
American men's ice hockey left wingers
Boston Bruins players
Colorado Avalanche players
Ice hockey players at the 1994 Winter Olympics
Ice hockey players at the 2002 Winter Olympics
Ice hockey players at the 2006 Winter Olympics
Lake Superior State Lakers men's ice hockey players
Medalists at the 2002 Winter Olympics
Minnesota Wild players
National Hockey League All-Stars
National Hockey League first-round draft picks
New Jersey Devils draft picks
New Jersey Devils players
New York Islanders players
Olympic silver medalists for the United States in ice hockey
Stanley Cup champions
NCAA men's ice hockey national champions
AHCA Division I men's ice hockey All-Americans